Edwin Rodríguez (born May 5, 1985) is a Dominican professional boxer who lives in Worcester, Massachusetts.

Starred in the box office hit Bleed For This as Roberto Duran

Early life
Rodriguez moved to Worcester at age 13 with dreams of becoming the next great Dominican ballplayer.  The season for outdoor baseball is shorter due to New England's temperate climate. Edwin abandoned aspirations for baseball to take up boxing.

Amateur career
Rodriguez had an 84–9 record and won the USA Boxing Championships 2005 and the National Golden Gloves 2006 as a middleweight (165 pounds). Rodriguez was training for the USA Olympic qualifiers for the 2008 Summer Olympics when his pregnant fiancee delivered twins born 16 weeks premature. Rodriguez chose to dedicate his time to his family and eventually lost in the final qualifier for the Olympic box-offs. Following the Boston Marathon bombing, Rodriguez revealed that he had previously sparred with suspect Tamerlan Tsarnaev in 2010 and expressed regret that he had "slowed down" when he had Tsarnaev hurting 2 rounds into their sparring session.

Professional career
Rodriguez, known by the nickname "La Bomba", turned pro in 2008 for promoter Lou DiBella. Rodriguez is a world-ranked super middleweight (168 pounds). Rodriguez previously trained with Peter Manfredo Sr and currently trains with Ronnie Shields. Rodriguez was managed by Larry Army Jr until the weeks before the Monaco Million Dollar Super Four Tournament, after which the two sides worked out an agreement and announced an amicable split. Rodriguez signed with manager Al Haymon and are in negotiations for his next fight, likely against a title holder and on Showtime.  Rodriguez wears Rival gloves, is affiliated with Scientific Nutrition for Advanced Conditioning (SNAC), and has included hypoxic boxing techniques in his training. He has steadily developed into a world title contender with recent wins against previously undefeated Will Rosinsky, Don George, and previously unbeaten Jason Escalera. Rodriguez is currently ranked No. 1 by the WBC, No. 3 by the IBF, No. 3 by the WBA, and No. 7 by The Ring magazine, and has been mentioned as a likely title contender in 2013 or 2014.

Monte-Carlo Million Dollar Super Four
Rodriguez won the Monaco Million Dollar Super Four Tournament by beating previously undefeated Ezequiel Maderna in a unanimous decision before an impressive first round TKO in the final against Denis Grachev to collect the winner's share on the 60/40 split of the $1 million purse.

Victory over Craig Baker
On May 23, 2015 Rodriguez defeated Craig Baker by TKO in the third round of a Premier Boxing Champions bout in the Agganis Arena, Boston, televised live on NBC.

Victory over Michael Seals
On November 13, 2015 Rodriguez defeated Michael Seals by TKO in the third round of a Premier Boxing Champions bout in the Beau Rivage Resort & Casino Biloxi, Mississippi, televised live on Spike TV. Edwin Rodriguez barely survived the first round after being floored twice, but he quickly rallied to stop Michael Seals in the third round, using three knockdowns of his own.

Professional boxing record

Personal life
Rodriguez moved to the US from the Dominican Republic in 1998. Rodriguez credits working in his father's convenience store as instrumental in helping him learn English and adjust to life in the US. Rodriguez is father to a twin son and daughter born 23 weeks into his fiancee's pregnancy in 2006. His children faced difficult odds as micro preemies born 16 weeks premature but persevered in large part to their parents' dedication and sacrifice. Rodriguez and his fiancee married in 2010 and welcomed another son in 2013.

References

External links

Biography of Edwin Rodriguez on Premier Boxing Champions website 

Living people
1985 births
Dominican Republic male boxers
Boxers from Massachusetts
Middleweight boxers
Winners of the United States Championship for amateur boxers
National Golden Gloves champions
American male boxers